Below is a list of notable footballers who have played for AC Bellinzona. Generally, this means players that have played 100 or more league matches for the club. However, some players who have played fewer matches are also included; this includes players that have had considerable success either at other clubs or at international level, as well as players who are well remembered by the supporters for particular reasons.

Key
 GK — Goalkeeper
 DF — Defender
 MF — Midfielder
 FW — Forward

Nationality is indicated by the corresponding FIFA country code(s).

References

 
Bellinzona
AC Bellinzona
Association football player non-biographical articles